The Potter House was a historic home in St. Petersburg, Florida. On June 13, 1986, it was added to the U.S. National Register of Historic Places. By 1990, despite attempts by area preservationists, the house was demolished.

References

External links
 Pinellas County listings at National Register of Historic Places
 Pinellas County listings at Florida's Office of Cultural and Historical Programs

Houses on the National Register of Historic Places in Florida
National Register of Historic Places in Pinellas County, Florida
Houses in St. Petersburg, Florida
Buildings and structures demolished in 1990
1990 disestablishments in Florida